In mathematics, Tate duality or Poitou–Tate duality is a duality theorem for Galois cohomology groups of modules over the Galois group of an algebraic number field or local field, introduced by  and .

Local Tate duality

For a p-adic local field , local Tate duality says there is a perfect pairing of the finite groups arising from Galois cohomology:

The statement also holds when  is an Archimedean field, though the definition of the cohomology groups looks somewhat different in this case.

Global Tate duality
This is done via the localization maps

Summing the local pairings gives a canonical perfect pairing

The map  has a finite kernel for all , and Tate also constructs a canonical perfect pairing

These dualities are often presented in the form of a nine-term exact sequence

Here, the asterisk denotes the Pontryagin dual of a given locally compact abelian group.

For the more general result, see e.g.
.

Poitou–Tate duality
Among other statements, Poitou–Tate duality establishes a perfect pairing between certain Shafarevich groups.

See also

Artin–Verdier duality
Tate pairing

References

 

Algebraic number theory
Galois theory
Duality theories